Darius Dodge Hare (January 9, 1843 – February 10, 1897) was a soldier, lawyer, and a two-term U.S. Representative from Ohio from 1891 to 1895.

Biography
Born near Adrian, Ohio, Hare attended the common schools. During the Civil War, he enlisted in March 1864 as a private in the Signal Corps of the Union Army, and served during the remainder of the conflict. He mustered out of the army in 1865 and returned home.

After the war, Hare attended the University of Michigan Law School. He was admitted to the bar in September 1867 and commenced practice in Carey, Ohio. He moved to Upper Sandusky, Ohio, in May 1868, and served as the mayor of Upper Sandusky from 1872-82.

Hare was elected as a Democrat to the Fifty-second and Fifty-third Congresses (March 4, 1891–March 3, 1895). He declined to be a candidate for renomination in 1894.

Death
He continued the practice of law until his death in Upper Sandusky on February 10, 1897. He was interred in Oak Hill Cemetery.

See also

References
 Retrieved on 2008-09-30

1843 births
1897 deaths
People from Carey, Ohio
Ohio lawyers
Democratic Party members of the United States House of Representatives from Ohio
Union Army soldiers
University of Michigan Law School alumni
People of Ohio in the American Civil War
Mayors of places in Ohio
19th-century American politicians
People from Seneca County, Ohio
19th-century American lawyers